Overview of the 2019–20 season of association football in the Maldives. The season was abandoned on 15 March 2020, due to the COVID-19 pandemic in the Maldives. It was declared void on 30 March 2020.

National teams

Maldives national football team

Results and fixtures

Friendlies

 1 Non-FIFA 'A' international match

2019 Indian Ocean Island Games

Group B

2022 FIFA World Cup qualification – AFC second round

Group A

Maldives U-23 national football team

2020 AFC U-23 Championship qualification

Group D

2019 South Asian Games

Round Robin stage

Maldives U-19 national football team

2020 AFC U-19 Championship qualification

Group C

Maldives U-18 national football team

2019 SAFF U-18 Championship

Group A

Semi-final

Third place match

Maldives U-16 national football team

2020 AFC U-16 Championship qualification

Group C

 2 AFC awarded Palestine, Maldives and Iran a 3–0 win as a result of Afghanistan fielding two ineligible players. The original match results were Afghanistan 2–2 Palestine, Maldives 0–3 Afghanistan and Iran 4–0 Afghanistan.

Maldives U-15 national football team

2019 UEFA ASSIST U-15 International Tournament

Round Robin stage

Maldives women's national football team

Results and fixtures

Friendlies

2019 SAFF Women's Championship

Group B

2019 South Asian Games

Round Robin stage

AFC competitions

AFC Cup

Qualifying play-offs

Preliminary round 2

|+South Asia Zone

Play-off round

|+South Asia Zone

Group stage

Group E

International club competitions

Sheikh Kamal International Club Cup

Group A

Men's football

Premier League

Second Division

Per statistical convention in football, matches decided in extra time are counted as wins and losses, while matches decided by penalty shoot-out are counted as draws.

Third Division

Jazeera Championship

Minivan Championship was re-branded to Jazeera Championship on 30 September 2019. On 9 October 2019, Football Association of Maldives announced that the first tournament under the current format will be held on January 25, 2020.

Cup competitions

FA Cup

Charity Shield

First leg

Second leg

FAM Youth Championship

Final

Notes

References

 
 
Maldives
Maldives